O25 may refer to:
 Douglas O-25, an observation aircraft of the United States Army Air Corps
 , a submarine of the Royal Netherlands Navy
 Obelisk (hieroglyph)
 Oxygen-25, an isotope of oxygen